The Melungeon DNA Project is a genetic study started in 2005 by the private company Family Tree DNA of people with identified Melungeon ancestors (according to historic records), mostly residing in Hancock County, Tennessee and people with ancestors identified as Carmel Indians who lived in nearby areas of Kentucky.  The Melungeon people are a mixed-race group who married within the group up until about 1900. There was speculation about their identity and ancestry for decades, and many differing accounts of their origins.

This study was started in 2005. Researchers published an article in 2012 summarizing their results. The female ancestors were shown to have had European DNA, while male ancestors had DNA from African or European haplogroups. Only one male had a Native American haplogroup.

Background 
The term "Melungeon" was used by others from the early 19th century to describe a group of people living in Hancock County, Tennessee, and nearby areas. It was originally a pejorative.  Vardy Collins is considered the patriarch of the Melungeons.  Author Roberta Estes states that the first mention of Melungeons was in an 1810 record, identifying them as "foreigners" or "Portuguese", rather than either Negro or Indian.

Marriage between Whites, Blacks, and Native Americans (including free people of color) was prohibited or taboo in many parts of the Thirteen Colonies from the mid-18th century onwards, but free mixed-race families were formed by white women and African or African-American men before the American Revolutionary War. As the women were free, their children were born free, under the laws of the colonies that said children were born into their mother's status, according to the principle of partus sequitur ventrem.

In the mid-to-late 19th century, some Melungeons were living on the frontier and considered white by their neighbors and by the law. Some Melungeons served in the military, voted, and carried arms—all of which obligations and rights were reserved at the time for White male citizens. Following the 1831 Nat Turner slave rebellion, southern states such as North Carolina had reduced the rights they had formerly extended to free people of color and free blacks.

While the Melungeon communities largely practiced endogamy until c. 1900, marrying among their neighbors and known cohort; since then, individuals identifying as Melungeon have increasingly been marrying into the general population of White Americans.

Project

Project organization 
Jack Goins, the project coordinator, is also the Hawkins County archivist.  Of proven Melungeon ancestry, Goins has been researching the group for years and is the author of Melungeon and Other Pioneer Families and Melungeons Footprints From the Past.  Additional project administrators have included Roberta Estes, Janet Crain, Penny Ferguson, and Kathy James.  Estes founded 'DNA-Explained' in 2004, which includes a tag category on Melungeon posts.

Participant identification 
Melungeon researchers determined participants' genealogical suitability for inclusion in the study based on historical documentation; a number of surnames have been identified as associated with Melungeon families (see below). The project was initiated in 2005 and is on-going.  Participants must descend in a direct paternal line for Y chromosome (Y-DNA) testing, or in a direct female line for Mitochondrial DNA (mtDNA) testing.

Study subjects 
The project organizers designated the following as core families, based on historical documentation: 
Group 1 Core Melungeon
Bunch, Goins, Gibson, Minor, Collins, Williams, Goodman, Denham, Bowlin, Mullins, Moore, Shumake, Boltons, Perkins, Mornings, Menleys, Breedlove, Hopkins and Mallett; including name variations.

Group 2 Melungeon Related.
If the above names are in the participant's family, but are not in a direct line to enable Y-DNA or mtDNA testing, participants are placed in the Melungeon Related group.

More surnames may be added as this is an ongoing project.

Initial results 
Results of the Melungeon Core DNA Project were summarized in "Melungeons, A Multi-Ethnic Population", published in the Journal of Genetic Genealogy (April 2012).

All of the few women tested belonged to haplogroup H (predominantly found in Europe) in their direct female lines. There is no single mtDNA maternal line for all Melungeons tested. All of the mtDNA of subjects tested was found to be of European origin.

Tested males belonged primarily to African and European haplogroups, with the majority (12 of 21) in the latter. One male showed descent from a Native American haplogroup. Only one person in the project (from the Freeman line) tested as having Native American ancestry on the Y side. Eight lines were found to have African Y chromosome haplogroups, and 12 were European.

Participant breakdown by haplogroup was as follows: R1b (38 people) 47.5% , E1b1a1-M2 (27 people) 33.75%, R1a (6 people) 7.5%, I1 (3 people) 3.75%, A (2 people) 2.5%, E1b1b1 (2 people) 2.5%, Q1a3a1 (1 person) 1.25%, I2 (1 person) 1.25%.

The results by surnames tested are not shown on the project's public website.

Conclusions 
There is no proof regarding the parentage of Vardy Collins, considered the patriarch of the Melungeons.  Vardy Collins' DNA belonged to the R1a1a (European) haplogroup. His wife, Margaret Gibson, nicknamed "Spanish Peggy," showed positive for maternal haplogroup H.  Gibson is thought to be the daughter of Andrew Gibson (R1b1b2 group)."

The DNA test shows the regional origin of the original ancestors of direct male or female lines, but not which culture their descendants may have identified with in succeeding years.  Neither does it indicate how far back the admixture occurred.

References

External links 
Melungeon DNA Project – Y Line Results, Family Tree DNA
Melungeon DNA Project – mtDNA Line Results, Family Tree DNA
Melungeon tag category, DNA-Explained

Society of Appalachia
Ethnic groups in Appalachia
Genetic genealogy projects